The Paredes de Coura Festival, currently named Vodafone Paredes de Coura for sponsorship reasons, is a music festival that is held every year, in August, at Praia do Taboão in Paredes de Coura, Portugal. The first edition was held in 1993.

It is currently one of the most popular summer music festivals in Portugal. In 2005, the Spanish edition of Rolling Stone named it as one of the five best summer festivals in Europe.

Editions

References

External links
 Official Paredes de Coura Festival Web Site

Rock festivals in Portugal
Culture in Paredes de Coura
Heavy metal festivals in Portugal
Music festivals established in 1993
Tourist attractions in Viana do Castelo District
1993 establishments in Portugal
Annual events in Portugal
Summer events in Portugal